Daniel "Dan" Waenga (born 6 November 1985) is a New Zealand rugby union player. He plays in the fly-half (and occasionally inside centre) position for the Waikato based Super Rugby side the Chiefs, and for French club Biarritz Olympique.

References

1985 births
New Zealand rugby union players
Chiefs (rugby union) players
Bay of Plenty rugby union players
Hawke's Bay rugby union players
Biarritz Olympique players
Expatriate rugby union players in France
New Zealand expatriates in France
Rugby union fly-halves
Living people
Rugby union centres
New Zealand rugby union referees
Super Rugby referees